Hobeni is a village in Mbhashe Local Municipality in the Eastern Cape province of South Africa.

Ikhaya Loxolo, a community and farm for people with special needs, is located near the village.

Notable people 
 Donald Woods, journalist and anti-apartheid activist

References

Populated places in the Mbhashe Local Municipality